Allan Tannenbaum is a photographer in the United States. He has worked for the SoHo Weekly News until it shut down in 1982, worked for Sygma Photo News until 2000, and then Polaris Images. He won a World Press Photo General News Award. He photographed many Rock icons in the 1970s and the New Yorker referred to him as a Rock n' Roll photographer in 2007.

In 1978, he photographed Sid Vicious in handcuffs leaving the hotel room where his girlfriend was dead. He photographed The Ramones. He took the cover photograph for Nelson Mandela's book Long Walk to Freedom. The band Devo used a photo he took for the SoHo Weekly News for their album cover on Duty Now for the Future. He also did the cover photography for Ten Percent, male vocal quartet Double Exposure's debut studio album released in 1976. He photographed performance artist Stephen Varble.

In 2001 he photographed the aftermath of the 9/11 terrorist attack.

He wrote about New York in the 1970s and his experiences.

He photographed John Lennon and Yoko Ono nude in bed together. He sued Universal Music Group for using one of the photographs.

Bibliography
New York in the 70s by Allan Tannenbaum (2011)
New York by Allan Tannenbaum (2004)
John and Yoko: A New York Love Story by Allan Tannenbaum (2007)

References

20th-century American photographers
21st-century American photographers
Year of birth missing (living people)
Living people